Tere Ishq Mein Ghayal is an Indian Hindi-language supernatural fantasy television series that premiered on 13 February 2023 on Colors TV. An adaptation of the successful american Supernatural Series The Vampire Diaries, produced by Yash A Patnaik and Mamta Patnaik under the banner of Beyond Dreams Entertainment and Inspire Films, it stars Karan Kundrra, Gashmeer Mahajani and Reem Shaikh in main roles respectively.

Plot
Many years ago, Avantika plead to her werewolf lover Tej to make her a werewolf like him, so they could be together, to which Tej refused. Eventually Tej was shot and killed. Avantika vowed that someday a lover would come to fulfill their incomplete love story. 

Years later, Eisha Sharma, is still grieving from the loss of her parents. She met Armaan Oberoi, a werewolf. Eisha felt a connection between her and Armaan. Armaan's brother Veer, also a werewolf, wanted Eisha as she looked exactly like his lover Kavya, also a werewolf, who was burned to death by a villager. Armaan wanted Eisha as he is in love with her. Whereas Veer wants Eisha to take revenge on Armaan, as he believes Armaan is the reason for Kavya's death.

Cast

Main
 Gashmeer Mahajani as Armaan Oberoi: A 123 year old werewolf; Veer's brother; Tina's best friend; Isha's love interest (2023-present)
 Karan Kundrra as Veer Oberoi: A 122 year old werewolf; Armaan's younger brother; Kavya's love interest (2023-present)
 Reem Shaikh as 
 Isha Sharma: Viaan's elder sister; Armaan's love interest; Mehek and Cherry's best friend, Sudha's biological daughter (2023-present)
 Kavya: A 500+ year old werewolf who manipulated both Armaan and Veer to be her lovers for her own benefit (Flashback)(Dead)

Recurring
 Pooja Singh as Malini -  Eisha and Viaan's aunt (2023-present)
 Kunal Khosla as Viaan Sharma -  Esha's younger brother; Sara's love interest (2023-present)
 Vaishnavi Dhanraj as Mehek Roy -  A Yogini; Esha's best friend; Arundhti's granddaughter; Cherry, Lakshya, Sara, Armaan, Veer, Maahir and Viaan's friend; Chandrika's Great-Granddaughter (2023-present)
 Nalini Negi as Cherry Diwaan -  Esha's best friend; Maaya's daughter; Veer's ex-girlfriend, Lakshay's current girlfriend; Mehek, Armaan, Sara, Maahir and Viaan's Friend (2023-present)
 Vishal Nayak /  Ayub Khan as Vikram Oberoi - Armaan and Veer's father (2023)/(2023-present) 
 Priya Bathija as Mrs. Oberoi - Vikram's wife; Armaan and Veer's mother (2023)
 Nimai Bali as Mayor - A mahishi; Taruneema's husband; Maahir's father; Maaya's friend (2023-present)
 Smriti Tarun Khanna as Taruneema; the mayor's wife and Maahir's mother.
 Nidhi Shetty as Sara - A normal girl who gets turned into a werewolf; Lakshya's sister; Viaan's love interest (2023)(Dead) 
 Prabhat Chaudhary as Lakshya - Sara's brother; Mehek, Maahir and Viaan's friend; Esha's ex-boyfriend and Cherry's current boyfriend (2023-present) 
 Roma Navrani as ACP Maaya Diwaan - A police officer; Cherry's mother; Mayor's friend (2023-present) 
 Kavita Vaish as Arundhti Roy - A Yogini; Mehek's grandmother; Chandrika's Granddaughter (2023-present)
 Unknown - as Izaa, Caretaker of the Oberoi Mansion
 Priya Sinha as Tina - A 350 years old werewolf; Armaan's friend (2023)(Cameo Role) 
 Meherzan Mazda as Maahir - Mayor and Taruneema's son, a Mahish (2023-present)
 Nikhil Arya as Sameer Acharya - A new history teacher of Landsale college; Sudha's Ex-husband; Eisha's biological father (2023-present) 
 Nidhi Sisodiya as Chandrika Ghosh - A Former Yogini and Soul; Arundhti's grandmother; Mehek's Great-Grandmother (2023) (Cameo Role)
 Nisha Agarwal as Nikita - A Yogini; Veer's 20 year old ago friend (2023-present) 
 Aditi Rawat as Ahana - Viaan's new love interest, a werewolf (2023-present)
 Gultesham as Kartik - A Werewolf; Tina's boyfriend (2023-present)
 Shardul Pandit as Adi, a werewolf turned by Ahana.
 Shilpa Saklani as Sudha Acharya, Sameer'ex wife, a werewolf turned by Veer, Eisha's biological mother.

Cameo appearances
 Arjun Bijlani as Tej: A werewolf, Avantika's lover (2023)
 Niyati Fatnani as Avantika: Tej's lover (2023)

Production

Casting
Karan Kundrra as Veer, Reem Shaikh as Isha and Gashmeer Mahajani as Armaan were signed as the lead.

The series also features Arjun Bijlani and Niyati Fatnani in cameo appearances.

Development
The series was announced by Beyond Dreams Entertainment and Inspire Films for Colors TV in December 2022. The series is a remake of The Vampire Diaries. Initially titled "Bhediya – Ishq Aur Junoon", later changed to "Ishq Mein Ghayal" and launched with the title "Tere Ishq Mein Ghayal".

Filming
In December 2022, principal photography commenced in Dehradun, with some initial sequences shot at Forest Research Institute.

Reception

Critical response
India Today noted its poor makeup and VFX and stated that "There should have been an eerie aura attached to the plot, but honestly, the fight scenes as well as the shapeshifting scenes gave us the laughs, thanks to poor VFX." but also noted that "If there was someone who actually went beyond and gave a great performance, it was Karan Kundrra. He was simply realistic and we loved watching him."

Mid-Day critised the chemistry between the lead pair and stated that "sadly, Mahajani and Sheikh exhibit no passion or longing; they seem better suited as siblings." but also praised the show for its "choreography, song selection, picturisation and setting" and termed them "perfect"

See also
 List of programmes broadcast by Colors TV

References

External links

 Tere Ishq Mein Ghayal on Colors TV
 
 Tere Ishq Mein Ghayal on Voot

2023 Indian television series debuts
2020s Indian television series
Hindi-language television shows
Colors TV original programming
Television series about werewolves